Vorbach is a municipality in Bavaria, Germany.

Vorbach may also refer to:
Vorbach (Tauber, Rothenburg ob der Tauber), a river of Baden-Württemberg and of Bavaria, Germany, tributary of the Tauber near Rothenburg ob der Tauber
Vorbach (Tauber, Weikersheim), a river of Baden-Württemberg, Germany, tributary of the Tauber at Weikersheim
a village of Ebern, a town in Bavaria, Germany